Albert Gene Anthony Connell (born May 13, 1974) is a former American football wide receiver who played for the Washington Redskins and the New Orleans Saints of the National Football League, and for the Calgary Stampeders of the Canadian Football League.

College career
He played college football at Trinity Valley Community College in Athens, Texas for two years, and was a member of the 1994 Junior College National Championship team.  He was teammates with Al Harris of the Packers, Matt Bryant of the Buccaneers, coach Frank Induisi of St Thomas Aquinas High School, and coach Mark Sartain of East Texas Baptist University.  He then went on to play two years at Texas A&M University.  In the Aggies' game against Colorado on September 28, 1996, he had 18 receptions.

Professional career
Connell was drafted in the fourth round of the 1997 NFL Draft, the 115th overall pick.  The 6'2", 190-pound receiver played in five games in his first season with the Washington Redskins.  He had nine receptions for 138 yards and two touchdowns.  In 1998, he played in fourteen games and had 28 receptions for 451 yards and two touchdowns.  In 1999, he played in fifteen games and had 62 receptions for 1,132 yards and a career-high seven touchdowns.  In 2000, he played in 13 games and had 39 receptions for 762 yards and three touchdowns.

In the spring of 2001, the New Orleans Saints signed him to a five-year, $13 million contract that included a $2.5 million signing bonus.  In 2001, he played 12 games for the Saints, recording 12 receptions for 191 yards and two touchdowns.  His future in the NFL was cut short when he was accused of stealing from Deuce McAllister.  He allegedly stole $4,000 from his former Saints teammate and was released from the team.  He never played in the NFL again.

References

1974 births
Living people
American football wide receivers
Calgary Stampeders players
Canadian football wide receivers
New Orleans Saints players
Players of American football from Fort Lauderdale, Florida
Texas A&M Aggies football players
Trinity Valley Cardinals football players
Washington Redskins players
Piper High School (Florida) alumni